Adelphi is an unincorporated area and census-designated place in Prince George's County, Maryland, United States. Per the 2020 Census, the population was 16,823. Adelphi includes the following subdivisions; Adelphi, Adelphi Park, Adelphi Hills, Adelphi Terrace, Adelphi Village, Buck Lodge, Chatham, Cool Spring Terrace, Hillandale Forest, Holly Hill Manor, Knollwood, Lewisdale, and White Oak Manor.

History
The unincorporated Adelphi community takes its name from the historic Adelphi Mill, established in 1796 along the Northwest Branch of the Anacostia River. and continues to attract visitors and can be rented for special functions. During the 19th century, George Washington Riggs acquired much of the area northeast of Washington, D.C., as his Green Hill estate in the Chillum Manor district. That estate included present-day Adelphi. In the early 1920s, part of the area was acquired by Leander McCormick-Goodhart as part of his Langley Park estate. Labor organizer Mary Harris "Mother" Jones died in 1930, at the farm of Walter and Lillie May Burgess near Powder Mill and Riggs Roads in present-day Adelphi. A marker was erected by the Maryland State Highway Administration commemorating Mother Jones at her death site. Unlike its nearby neighbors Hyattsville and College Park, the area remained relatively undeveloped until immediately following World War II. At that time, subdivisions quickly developed. To distinguish it from the other neighboring unincorporated communities of Lewisdale and Langley Park, the growing subdivisions banded together in the mid-1950s and adopted the name "Adelphi" to reflect their commitment to the preservation of the historic mill of the same name. A community focal point that originally developed in the late 1950s is the Adelphi Pool, a private pool in the Adelphi neighborhood, located next to George Washington Cemetery on Riggs Road. Use of the Adelphi Pool requires paid membership or being accompanied by a member and paying a small fee. The Adelphi pool offers swimming lessons and also features swim teams which compete against each other. Two notable features of the Adelphi Pool are its long water slide and basketball hoop.

That facility continues as the Adelphi Laboratory Center, Army Research Laboratory (ARL), the U.S. Army's corporate research laboratory. Other adjacent federal facilities include the National Archives at College Park and headquarters of the Food and Drug Administration.

Historic sites
The following is a list of historic sites in Adelphi identified by the Maryland-National Capital Park and Planning Commission:

Geography
Adelphi is located at  (38.996860, −76.966755).

Adjacent areas
 Hillandale (northwest)
 Beltsville (north)
 Calverton (north)
 College Park (southeast)
 Hyattsville (south)
 Lewisdale (southwest)
 Langley Park (southwest)
 Silver Spring (west)

Demographics

2020 census

Note: the US Census treats Hispanic/Latino as an ethnic category. This table excludes Latinos from the racial categories and assigns them to a separate category. Hispanics/Latinos can be of any race.

2000 Census
As of 2000, there were 14,998 people, 5,332 households, and 3,321 families that were reported to be living in Adelphi, Maryland. The racial makeup of the CDP was quite diverse, including 29.48% White, 39.83% African American, 0.28% Native American, 9.95% Asian, 0.06% Pacific Islander, 15.04% from other races, and 5.36% from two or more races. Hispanic or Latino of any race were 25.74% of the population.

There were 5,332 households, out of which 30.6% had children under the age of 18 living with them, 42.5% were married couples living together, 13.5% had a female householder with no husband present, and 37.7% were non-families. 27.5% of all households were made up of individuals, and 6.1% had someone living alone who was 65 years of age or older. The average household size was 2.77 and the average family size was 3.35.

In the CDP, the age distribution of the population included 22.7% under the age of 18, 13.0% from 18 to 24, 35.7% from 25 to 44, 19.1% from 45 to 64, and 9.5% who were 65 years of age or older. The median age was 32 years. For every 100 females, there were 98.1 males. For every 100 females age 18 and over, there were 96.6 males.

The median income for a household in the CDP was $45,827, and the median income for a family was $53,839. Males had a median income of $32,495 versus $31,932 for females. The per capita income for the CDP was $20,952. About 6.6% of families and 9.0% of the population were below the poverty line, including 6.2% of those under age 18 and 7.4% of those age 65 or over.

Government and infrastructure
The University of Maryland System has an office in Adelphi.

The Prince George's County Police Department serves Adelphi through District 1, with its station in Hyattsville.

The Chillum-Adelphi Volunteer Fire Department (CAVFD) serves Adelphi. The station is in Langley Park CDP and has an Adelphi postal address. In March 1951 and June 8, 1951 the CAVFD was established and chartered, respectively. From November and March 1953 the fire station on Riggs Road was constructed; the County Volunteer Firemen's Association designated it Station No. 34. Portions of Station No. 34 were rebuilt in the early 1960s, and it was rededicated on November 16, 1963. In 1962 the CAVFD began building a substation, No. 44, which was dedicated on November 16, 1963, but in 1992 it sold the substation to the county government.

Education
Adelphi is the home of the University of Maryland Global Campus, and the community is located near the University of Maryland main campus in College Park.

Adelphi is served by the Prince George's County Public Schools system. In 2000, a new elementary school opened in the community dedicated to labor organizer Mary Harris "Mother" Jones.

Elementary schools in Adelphi:
 Adelphi Elementary School
 Cherokee Lane Elementary School
 Cool Spring Elementary School
 Mary Harris "Mother" Jones Elementary School 
A southeastern section is zoned to University Park Elementary School in University Park.

Most residents are zoned to Buck Lodge Middle School in Adelphi and High Point High School in Beltsville. A southeastern section is zoned to Hyattsville Middle School and Northwestern High School in Hyattsville.

Commerce

The main shopping centers that serve the Adelphi neighborhood are the Adelphi Shopping Center, Adelphi Plaza, and Metzerott Plaza.

Adelphi Shopping Center

The Adelphi Shopping Center is located at the corner of University Boulevard and West Park Drive. From 1955 until July 25, 2010, the Adelphi Shopping Center was home to the original Ledo Restaurant, an Italian restaurant famous for its specialty pizzas. On July 25, 2010, the Original Ledo Restaurant closed its doors in the Adelphi Shopping Center and reopened its new location a few miles away in Downtown College Park. The restaurant has been and continues to be a long-time favorite of University of Maryland students/faculty as well as residents of the Adelphi and College Park communities. In the middle of 2011, the El Amate Texas Mexican restaurant/bar took over Ledo's former space in the Adelphi Shopping Center.

The Adelphi Shopping Center was also home to a Jumbo Food Store, which opened on October 1, 1958. The Jumbo Food Store was converted into a Shoppers Food Warehouse store in the late 1980s. In 1994, the Shoppers Food Warehouse in the Adelphi Shopping Center was damaged in a fire. The Shoppers Food Warehouse used the fire as an opportunity to modernize its interior. However, 17 years later, in Spring 2011, the Shoppers Food Warehouse closed its doors in the Adelphi Shopping Center. One year later in the middle of 2012, the MegaMart chain of Latino supermarkets opened a "MegaFarmer's Supermarket" in Shoppers' former location. MegaMart already had a store across the street at the Adelphi Plaza; this store remains open as well. The Adelphi Shopping Center is also home to a Loch Lomond bakery, Asian carryout restaurant, SunTrust Bank, Haircut 2000 barber shop, H&R Block, Cricket Wireless, and Advance Auto Parts.

Adelphi Plaza

The Adelphi Plaza is another shopping center that serves the Adelphi neighborhood. It is just west of the Adelphi Shopping Center on the same side of University Boulevard. The Adelphi Plaza contains a MegaMart Supermarket, Sabor Latino restaurant, La Casa De La Musica, McDonald's, King Kong Chinese Restaurant, and a Shell gas station. The MegaMart Supermarket in Adelphi, MD was formerly named as, "Panam Supermarket", as the MegaMart chain in the D.C. area used to be called,"Panam Supermarket", until 2009. From that year onwards. the chain was known as, "MegaMart". The supermarket opened and has been operating from the year of 2004.

Metzerott Plaza

Metzerott Plaza is the third shopping center that serves the Adelphi neighborhood. It is located at the corner of Adelphi Road and Riggs Road. Metzerott Plaza consists of Bestway supermarket, Walgreens pharmacy (formerly Rite Aid), 7-Eleven, Bank of America branch, Popeyes restaurant, Basil's pizzaria, SkyLake laundromat, and Western Union. Metzerott Plaza was anchored by a Safeway supermarket for more than thirty years until it closed on November 4, 2006. A Bestway Latin American Supermarket has been operating in Safeway's former spot. The shopping center also previously contained a McDonald's restaurant and Bustin' Suds Laundromat. They closed a little earlier in the summer of 2006. The golden bull on the roof of the previous golden bull restaurant was removed in November 2021. A Wawa gas station and convenience store will open across Riggs Road from Metzerott Plaza in fall 2022.

Notable people
John Fahey— Recorded the first Tacoma Records album at the St. Michaels and All Angels Church
Fred Funk - professional golfer.
Roy Hibbert - NBA player for the Indiana Pacers
Mary Harris Jones (1837-1930) - Labor organizer known as "Mother" Jones
Hugh V. Perkins (1918-1988) - educator, author, and professor of Education, University of Maryland - College Park.

See also

Avenel-Hillandale, name of a census-designated place that was part of Adelphi in 1970.

References

External links

 Cool Spring Terrace Civic Association
 Adelphi Pool
 Chillum-Adelphi Volunteer Fire Department
 History of the Army Research Laboratory
 Mother Jones Plaque in Adelphi, MD
 A scalable PDF map of Prince George's County, MD, showing the boundaries of the Adelphi Census Designated Place and other CDPs and Census Incorporated Places in the county -- from the Maryland Department of Planning web site

 
Populated places established in 1796
Census-designated places in Prince George's County, Maryland
Census-designated places in Maryland
Washington metropolitan area
1796 establishments in Maryland
Outer Silver Spring, Maryland